Alphée of the Stars is a Canadian documentary film, directed by Hugo Latulippe and released in 2012. The film documents a sabbatical year taken by Latulippe and his then-wife Laure Waridel in Switzerland, and its impact on their daughter Alphée, who has developmental disabilities caused by Smith–Lemli–Opitz syndrome.

Awards

The film received a Canadian Screen Award nomination at the 1st Canadian Screen Awards, for Best Feature Length Documentary, and a Jutra Award nomination for Best Documentary Film at the 15th Jutra Awards.

References

External links
 

2012 films
2012 documentary films
National Film Board of Canada documentaries
Quebec films
French-language Canadian films
Documentary films about families
2010s Canadian films